Kennie Tsui is a New Zealand chemical and environmental engineer. In July 2021, she was appointed chief executive of the New Zealand Geothermal Association.

Biography 
Tsui is the chair of the Wellington branch of Engineering New Zealand. Since 2016, she has been chair of the International Partnership of Geothermal Technologies. In 2019, she was appointed principal analyst for the New Zealand Climate Change Commission. In 2020, she received the Fulton-Downer Gold Medal for her leadership in the engineering industry.

References 

Living people
21st-century New Zealand engineers
Year of birth missing (living people)
New Zealand chemical engineers